Laurent Béghin (born 21 February 1976) is a French rower. He competed in the men's coxless four event at the 2000 Summer Olympics.

References

External links
 

1976 births
Living people
French male rowers
Olympic rowers of France
Rowers at the 2000 Summer Olympics
People from Château-Gontier
Sportspeople from Mayenne
World Rowing Championships medalists for France